Robert Samuel Kerr III (born October 12, 1950) is an American Democratic politician from the U.S. state of Oklahoma. He served as a member of the Oklahoma House of Representatives from the 86th district from 1978 to 1980, 12th lieutenant governor of Oklahoma from 1987 to 1991, and as chair of the Oklahoma Democratic Party. He ran unsuccessfully for Oklahoma's 3rd Congressional district seat, losing in the Democratic Party primary to State Representative William K. Brewster, he was endorsed by Carl Albert.

Kerr was raised in southeastern Oklahoma. He is the grandson of U.S. Senator Robert S. Kerr. As Lieutenant Governor of Oklahoma, he served alongside Governor Henry Bellmon.

Kerr endorsed Bill Bradley for President of the United States in 2000, and in 2004 he endorsed Dick Gephardt.

Electoral History

References

Lieutenant Governors of Oklahoma
Politicians from Oklahoma City
Living people
1950 births
Democratic Party members of the Oklahoma House of Representatives